Yunnanilus nanpanjiangensis is a species of ray-finned fish, a stone loach, in the genus Yunnanilus. It is endemic to China and uts type locality is near Agang Town, Luoping County, Yunnan and the specific name refers to the Nanpanjiang River.

References

N
Fish described in 1994